United is the 4th full length album by the Swedish heavy metal band Dream Evil. This is the first album by Dream Evil since the departures of Gus G. and Snowy Shaw, both of whom feature as guests on track 12.

Track listing

Notes
Bonus Disc is standard in the Japanese version and comes with a sticker of the front cover.

Credits
Niklas Isfeldt - Vocals
Fredrik Nordström - Guitars
Mark Black - Guitars
Peter Stålfors - Bass
Pat Power aka Patrik J - Drums

External links

UNITED Album Review

2006 albums
Dream Evil albums
Century Media Records albums
Albums produced by Fredrik Nordström